The Jersey Shore Council serves all of Ocean and Atlantic Counties, and part of Burlington and Cape May Counties. Its camp is the Joseph A. Citta Scout Reservation, located in Brookville, New Jersey.

History

In 2022, the council sold its  property in Toms River as part of the child abuse settlement.

Districts
The council is divided into the following districts:
 Joshua Huddy District (Brick, Jackson, Lakewood, Point Pleasant, and Toms River)
 Jersey Devil District (Barnegat, Bass River, Beachwood, Berkeley, Lacey, Lakehurst, Little Egg Harbor, Manahawkin, Manchester, New Egypt, New Gretna, Ocean Gate, Pine Beach, Seaside Heights, South Toms River, Tuckerton, Waretown, West Creek, and Whiting)
 Sea Pines District (All of Atlantic County and Ocean City)

Joseph A. Citta Scout Reservation 

The Joseph A. Citta Scout Reservation at Brookville is a Boy Scout Camp located in the Brookville section of Ocean Township, New Jersey. First opened in 1957, it was originally established as the Ocean County Scout Reservation, before becoming the Brookville Scout Reservation. The camp was later named for Joseph A. Citta, Ocean County's first public defender and philanthropist who donated the land to the Boy Scouts to create the scout reservation. It is located in the New Jersey Pine Barrens.

Citta currently has nine campsites that are available year round. The sites are Apache, Seneca, Comanche, Iroquois, Algonquin, Kewe, Chippewa, Mohican, and Mohawk. For Resident Summer camp, two-man canvas tents are provided for camper usage. When summer camp is not in session, people are required to bring their own tent, except in Kewe which has year round lean-tos.

References

External links 

Parks in New Jersey
Local councils of the Boy Scouts of America
Protected areas of Ocean County, New Jersey
Northeast Region (Boy Scouts of America)